Frank Elliott may refer to:
Frank Elliott (police officer) (1874–1939), assistant commissioner of the London Metropolitan Police
Frank R. Elliott (1877–1931), hardware merchant and political figure in Nova Scotia, Canada
Frank Elliott (actor) (1880–1970), English actor
Frank Elliott (cyclist) (1911–1964), Canadian Olympic cyclist
Frank Elliott (racing driver) (1891–1957), American racecar driver
Frank Worth Elliott Jr. (1924–1997), United States Air Force general
Frank Elliott (footballer) (1929–2018), Welsh footballer who played for Fulham, Mansfield Town and Stoke City